The Stadion der Freundschaft is a football stadium in Cottbus, Germany. It is the home ground of FC Energie Cottbus, originally opened in 1930, has a capacity of 22,528. It is the largest stadium in the city, followed by 4,999-capacity Max-Reimann-Stadion.

References 

FC Energie Cottbus
Freundschaft
Freundschaft
Buildings and structures in Cottbus
Sports venues in Brandenburg
Sports venues completed in 1930
1930 establishments in Germany